Sally is a 2000 American drama film, starring Rachael Leigh Cook, Michael Weston, and Fatmir Haskaj, and written and directed by first time director David Goldsmith, who also appears in the film as Jack.

Plot summary

Cast
 Michael Weston as Bugs (as Michael Rubenstein)
 Rachael Leigh Cook as Beth
 David Goldsmith as Jack
 Fatmir Haskaj as Wheels (as Xander Skye)
 Gerrit Vooren as Worm
 Matt Price as Sam
 Jared Reed as Bird
 Kevin Pinassi as Chatty
 Molly Russell as Nurse Kiels
 Sam Coppola as Dr. Felch

References

External links 
 
 
 

2000 films
2000 drama films
American drama films
2000s English-language films
2000s American films